Murray State College is a public community college in southeastern Oklahoma with the main campus located in Tishomingo, Oklahoma. It is named in honor of former Oklahoma Governor William H. "Alfalfa Bill" Murray.

Murray State College also maintains a smaller campus in Ardmore, Oklahoma as one of four state higher education institutions that participate at the University Center of Southern Oklahoma (the other three are Oklahoma State University, Southeastern State University, and East Central University).

History
Murray State College was established in 1908 in Tishomingo, Oklahoma, as the Murray State School of Agriculture in accordance with a law passed by the first Oklahoma Legislature. It was named after William H. Murray (known as "Alfalfa Bill") who had served as legal advisor to Governor Douglas H. Johnston of the Chickasaw Nation, was his delegate to the 1905 convention to draft a constitution for the proposed State of Sequoyah, and was the president of the constitutional convention to draft a document to create the state of Oklahoma, admitted to the union in 1907.

The college's first students, numbering about 100, were primarily Chickasaw and Choctaw. At first they had to board with families in town, but Murray, then a US Representative, in 1916 gained approval for Federal funding to construct two dormitories for Native American students. On March 17, 1924, the Oklahoma Legislature approved a measure to authorize the  institution to expand its curriculum to college-level course: it became a community college, granting its first associate degrees in 1924.

"Alfalfa Bill" Murray was elected as the ninth governor of the state in 1930. His nephew, Clive Murray, was appointed as president of the school in 1931 and served until 1961.  The school was renamed in 1955 as Murray State Agricultural College. It was renamed again in 1967, as Murray State College of Agriculture and Applied Science, reflecting its expanded programs.

In 1972, the school was removed from the authority of the Board of Regents for Agricultural and Mechanical Colleges and a separate board of regents was appointed to manage it. At the time, the institution was renamed Murray State College. (It is not to be confused with Murray State University in Murray, Kentucky).

Academics
Murray State College offers Associate of Arts, Associate of Science, and Associate of Applied Science degree programs.

Alumni
 Bill Anoatubby, Governor of the Chickasaw Nation
 R. Perry Beaver, principal chief of the Muscogee (Creek) Nation (1996 until 2003), football coach at Jenks
 Johnston Murray, attorney, politician and 14th Governor of Oklahoma (1951-1955)
 U. L. Washington, Major League Baseball player

See also
 List of colleges and universities in Oklahoma

References

External links
Official website

Vocational education in the United States
Education in Johnston County, Oklahoma
OK Cooperative Alliance
Educational institutions established in 1908
Education in Carter County, Oklahoma
Buildings and structures in Carter County, Oklahoma
Buildings and structures in Johnston County, Oklahoma
1908 establishments in Oklahoma
Tribal colleges and universities
Community colleges in Oklahoma
NJCAA athletics